Cap Gaspé is a headland located at the eastern extremity of the Gaspé Peninsula in the Canadian province of Quebec. It is located within Forillon National Park.

Headlands of Quebec
Landforms of Gaspésie–Îles-de-la-Madeleine
Gaspé Peninsula